Leonard John Kensell Setright (10 August 1931 – 7 September 2005) was an English motoring journalist and author.

Early life and education
Setright was born in London to Australian parents; his father, Henry Roy Setright, was an engineer who invented the Setright ticket machine used on buses and trams. He died when Setright was 11 years old. Setright attended Palmers Green Grammar school before studying law at the University of London which he practised for a time but hated the profession. His National Service was served in the Royal Air Force as an air traffic controller.

Writing career
After writing for the engineering magazine Machine Age in the early 1960s, Setright became a motoring journalist and author, contributing to Car Magazine for more than 30 years and writing several books on cars and automotive engineering. 
Setright's writing style polarised readers as some considered it to be pompous and excessively esoteric, while others found his erudite style and engineering knowledge a welcome change from the usual lightweight and largely non-technical journalistic style.  He had a strong enthusiasm for Bristol Cars and for Japanese engineering, in particular Honda.

Setright also wrote about music, motorcycles and high-fidelity sound systems, and contributed to, among others, Punch, The Independent, Bike, Cycle Guide/USA, Motorcycle Sport under the initials LJKS, Back Street Heroes and Car and Driver.

Personal life
Setright was also known for his love of smoking tobacco, in particular Sobranie Black Russian cigarettes, and for his elegant sartorial style.  He was described as resembling "a gaunt Old Testament prophet in Savile Row clothes".  He was an accomplished clarinet player.

Setright was a practising Jew and a scholar of Judaism. He was married twice; his first wife, Christina, committed suicide in 1980. After this he spent some time in a Lubavitch community in Texas, later returning to the UK, and he settled in Surbiton, near London, where he died of cancer in 2005.

List of works 
 Author

 
 
 
 
 
 
 
 
 
 
 
 
 
 
 
 
 
 
 
 
 Coauthor
 
 

 Editor

References

1931 births
2005 deaths
People educated at Southgate School
Alumni of University College London
People from Surbiton
Deaths from lung cancer
English Jews
British motoring journalists
Motorcycling writers
Historians of motorsport
Air traffic controllers